Estadio Eladio Rosabal Cordero is a multi-purpose stadium in Heredia, Costa Rica. The stadium holds 8,700 people and opened in 1951. It is currently used mostly for football matches and is the home stadium of Herediano.

The stadium is named after Herediano legend Eladio Rosabal Cordero, who founded the club in 1921.

References

Football venues in Costa Rica
Buildings and structures in Heredia Province